Anne Shaw may refer to:

Anne Shaw (poet), American poet; see Lexi Rudnitsky Prizes
Anne Shaw, character in Ride 'Em Cowboy
The Disappearance of Anne Shaw (1928), book by Augusta Huiell Seaman

See also
Ann Shaw (disambiguation)
Anna Shaw (disambiguation)